The Princely Beguinage Ten Wijngaerde (Dutch: Prinselijk Begijnhof Ten Wijngaerde) is the only preserved beguinage in the Belgian city of Bruges. There are no more Beguines living there, but since 1927 it has functioned as a convent for Benedictines, founded by canon Hoornaert. In the same year the houses at the west side were also reshaped and enlarged into the Monasterium De Wijngaard, a priory of Benedictine nuns.

History
Already before 1240 a community of pious women settled at the domain 'de Wingarde' (old Dutch for vineyard), in the South of the city. This name probably refers to low-lying meadows. The beguinage was founded around 1244 by Margaret of Constantinople, after she requested permission to Walter van Marvis, bishop of Tournai, to move over the tomb chapel on the Burg of Bruges to the Wijngaard. In 1245 it was recognised as an independent parish. In 1299 it came under direct authority of king Philip the Fair and it was entitled as "Princely Beguinage".

The complex includes a gothic beguinage church and about thirty white painted houses dating from the late 16th, 17th and 18th century. Practically all of these are built around a central yard. The main entrance with gate can be reached via the three-arched stone bridge, the Wijngaard Bridge. In a bay the image of the holy Elizabeth of Hungary can be seen, who was the patron of many beguinages. De Wijngaard is also devoted to Saint Alexius. The entrance gate was built in 1776 by master mason Hendrik Bultynck. The first Beguine house next to the entrance is furnished as a museum and the exhibition includes paintings, 17th and 18th century furniture and lacework, among others. A second gate gives access to the Sas House, via the Sas Bridge.

References

Bibliography
  Hoornaert H. (1921) Ce que c'est qu'un beguinage..., Desclée de Brouwer, Bruges.
  Hoornaert R. (1930) Le Beguinage de Bruges,son histoire, sa règle, sa vie, Desclée de Brouwer, Bruges.
  Beernaert B. et al. (1993) Begijnhofkerk H. Elisabeth, in: 17de-eeuwse architectuur in de binnenstad, Open Monumentendag 1993, Bruges.
  Van den Abeele A. (1998) Tuinen en verborgen hoekjes in Brugge, Brugge - Luik.
  Beernaert B. (2002) Begijnhof, tuin van het monasterium, in: Een tuin is meer dan er staat, Open Monumentendagen Brugge, Bruges.
  Dhondt R. (2008) Gravin Johanna van Constantinopel en het Brugs Begijnhof, in: Brugs Ommeland, pp. 228–237.
  Dhondt R. (2009) Problemen bij het omvormen van het Brugse begijnhof tot een parochie, in: Brugs Ommeland, pp. 51–59.
  Dhondt R. (2011) Wie woonde er voor 1300 op het Begijnhof te Brugge?, in: Brugs Ommeland, pp. 14–29.
  Van den Broecke E., Uyttenhove L. (2013) Laus Deo. Rodolphe Hoornaert en zijn werk, 1886-1969, Bruges-Leuven.

External links
 Monasterium De Wijngaard
 Begijnhuisje (museum)
 Beguinage De Wijngaard, Bruges in ODIS - Online Database for Intermediary Structures

World Heritage Sites in Belgium
Buildings and structures in Bruges
Beguinages